St. Charles College was a school in St. Charles, Missouri, established by the Methodist Episcopal Church in 1837.

History
John F. Fielding served as the first president until his death in 1842. During the American Civil War, classes were suspended and the local militia commander, Arnold Krekel, used the school for a hospital and also a prison. In 1891, the school admitted female students for the first time. It became a military school in 1901 and closed in 1915. In 1917 the school grounds were given to the city of Saint Charles to be used for a high school since the former high school had burned down. That building in turn burned down in 1922.

Sources
Western Historical Manuscript Collection report on St. Charles College

1837 establishments in Missouri
1915 establishments in Missouri
Buildings and structures in St. Charles County, Missouri
Defunct private universities and colleges in Missouri
Educational institutions established in 1837
Educational institutions disestablished in 1915
St. Charles, Missouri